W32 may refer to:
 Windows API, abbreviated win32 or w32
 W32.alcra.F, computer worm
 W32/Storm.worm, computer worm
 Empire Woodland, a British Empire ship
 Hansa-Brandenburg W.32, a First World War fighter floatplane prototype
 Washington Executive Airport or Hyde Field, an airport in Clinton, Maryland